Adrian Dix (born April 20, 1964) is a Canadian politician serving as the current Member of the Legislative Assembly (MLA) for Vancouver-Kingsway in British Columbia. In addition to serving as the current Member of the Legislative Assembly (MLA) for Vancouver-Kingsway in British Columbia, Dix is also serving as the current Minister Responsible for Francophone Affairs in British Columbia and the current Minister of Health in British Columbia. He has also served as the leader of the British Columbia New Democratic Party (BC NDP) from 2011 to 2014. He was first elected to the Legislative Assembly of British Columbia in the 2005 provincial election. Dix's decision in 2013 to be replaced as leader came following the party's disappointing result in the May 2013 provincial election which the BC NDP lost despite a 20-point lead in the polls prior to the election campaign.

Personal life
Adrian Dix was born in Vancouver, to parents Ken and Hilda, immigrants from Ireland and Britain, respectively. His parents ran the Dix Insurance Agency Ltd. on West 41st Avenue in Vancouver until 2011 when his father retired and sold the business. Growing up in Vancouver, Dix was raised as an Anglican and attended both St. George's School and Point Grey Secondary. He then went on to study history and political science at the University of British Columbia. Dix has two siblings and currently lives in Vancouver with his wife Renée Saklikar, a poet and writer. Dix was diagnosed with Type-1 diabetes in his 20s.

Career
Fluently bilingual, Dix lived in France as a young man and then worked in Ottawa for NDP MP Ian Waddell.

Chief of Staff
He served as Chief of Staff to BC Premier Glen Clark from 1996 to 1999, a position from which he was dismissed for back-dating a memo to protect Clark from conflict-of-interest charges. Dix has said of this incident, "It was wrong, it was wrong. I'm out there and I've admitted it and people will judge. But I'm not trying to hide my mistake." This memo would later become a focus of a number of opposition BC Liberal Party ads in the 2013 provincial election.

Subsequently, he went on to work as the executive director of Canadian Parents for French in their B.C./Yukon branch. The Vancouver Sun summarized his work in this position as "successfully encouraging more school boards to offer French immersion programs."

Political commentator
From 2001 to 2005 Dix was a political commentator in various media, writing a column for the Victoria Times-Colonist and The Source, a prominent intercultural newspaper in Vancouver. He was also a contributor to The Tyee and the CBC.

Member of the Legislative Assembly
Since 2005, Dix has served as the MLA for Vancouver-Kingsway. He first served as the opposition critic for Children and Families and then served as the Health critic.  As MLA, he cites among his achievements "bringing insulin pumps to children with Type 1 diabetes and his work on a successful campaign to stop three schools from being closed in Vancouver-Kingsway."

2011 NDP leadership race

The last candidate to publicly launch his leadership bid, Dix campaigned on a platform of eliminating the HST, rolling back reductions in the corporate tax rate, supporting the redirection of carbon tax revenue to pay for public transit and infrastructure that reduces greenhouse gas emissions, supporting an increase in the minimum wage rate to $10 per hour, creating a provincial child care system, restoring grants to the post-secondary students, reducing interest on student loans, and restoring the corporation capital tax on financial institutions.

His candidacy was endorsed by former interim BC NDP leader Joy MacPhail, amongst others.

Dix led throughout the voting, narrowly defeating rival Mike Farnworth on the third and final ballot with 51.8% of the vote.

Results

2013 British Columbia provincial election

Nearly all polls showed the NDP well ahead of the BC Liberals going into the 2013 election, with at least one showing the NDP ahead by as much as 20 points. Two months prior to the election, The Province newspaper's front page featured a column by pundit Michael Smyth with the banner headline: "If This Man Kicked A Dog He Would Still Win The Election." However, in a result that shocked the party and political pundits, the BC Liberals won a fourth majority government. The BC NDP won 34 seats, one fewer than in 2009.

Dix announced on September 18, 2013 that he would resign as party leader once a new leader (John Horgan) would be chosen in 2014. He also announced his intention to run for re-election as an MLA in the next provincial election.

2017 British Columbia provincial election

After the NDP formed government as a result of the 2017 election, Dix was appointed Minister of Health.

Minister of Health
On August 30, 2021, Dix announced an initiative to bring 4000 housekeepers and food service workers in provincial hospitals back under government employment by March 2022. This was an effort to reverse the fallout of the British Columbia Liberal Party administration passing the Health and Social Services Delivery Improvement Act in January 2002. The act facilitated the contracting of hospital support jobs to private employers, leading to thousands of hospital support workers to be laid off from the public sector and rehired under private contractors for reduced wages and benefits. One employee reported an hourly wage decline from $18.10 with benefits and a pension while under direct provincial employment to $10.15 with neither benefits nor pensions under the private sector. The Hospital Employees' Union had also reported the halving of wages upon being contracted by the private sector. Additionally, Premier John Horgan noted that these wage declines disproportionally affected women.

Election results

References

External links 

Profile from the B.C. Legislature

1964 births
Living people
British Columbia New Democratic Party MLAs
Canadian people of British descent
Canadian people of Irish descent
Health ministers of British Columbia
Leaders of the British Columbia CCF/NDP
Members of the Executive Council of British Columbia
People with type 1 diabetes
Politicians from Vancouver
University of British Columbia alumni
21st-century Canadian politicians
St. George's School (Vancouver) alumni